Ouvrage La Moutière is a lesser work (petit ouvrage) of the Maginot Line's Alpine extension, the Alpine Line at an altitude of 2440 meters.  The ouvrage consists of one entry block, one infantry block and one observation block, with an unarmed exit block. The ouvrage supported the Ouvrage Restefond on the crest of the pass, guarding its southern flank. It also covered the Col de la Barcelonnette to the north. The position was built between 1931 and 1935.

Description
See Fortified Sector of the Dauphiné for a broader discussion of the Dauphiné sector of the Alpine Line.
Block 1 (entry): two machine gun embrasures. The block is equipped with a metal housing that functions as an access point when the winter snows cover the entrance.
Block 2 (infantry block): one heavy twin machine gun embrasure.
Block 3 (observation block): one machine gun cloche.
Block 4 (emergency exit/exhaust): no armament.

The underground section of the ouvrage consists of three parallel galleries linked by a smaller passage.

A fortified barracks for La Moutière's garrison was established at a lower altitude inside a semi-buried abri or shelter. The area around the position retains the vestiges of firing positions constructed of dry stone masonry pierced by embrasures for guns. The fortification saw no action in either 1940 or 1944.

See also
 List of Alpine Line ouvrages

References

Bibliography
Allcorn, William. The Maginot Line 1928–45. Oxford: Osprey Publishing, 2003. 
Kaufmann, J.E. and Kaufmann, H.W. Fortress France: The Maginot Line and French Defenses in World War II, Stackpole Books, 2006. 
Kaufmann, J.E., Kaufmann, H.W., Jancovič-Potočnik, A. and Lang, P. The Maginot Line: History and Guide, Pen and Sword, 2011. 
Mary, Jean-Yves; Hohnadel, Alain; Sicard, Jacques. Hommes et Ouvrages de la Ligne Maginot, Tome 1. Paris, Histoire & Collections, 2001.  
Mary, Jean-Yves; Hohnadel, Alain; Sicard, Jacques. Hommes et Ouvrages de la Ligne Maginot, Tome 4 - La fortification alpine. Paris, Histoire & Collections, 2009.  
Mary, Jean-Yves; Hohnadel, Alain; Sicard, Jacques. Hommes et Ouvrages de la Ligne Maginot, Tome 5. Paris, Histoire & Collections, 2009.

External links
 La Moutière (petit ouvrage de) at fortiff.be 
 Map of the Col de la Bonette and La Moutiere

LAMO
Maginot Line
Alpine Line